Pawlowskiella is a genus of annelids belonging to the family Piscicolidae.

The species of this genus are found in Europe.

Species:

Pawlowskiella stenosa

References

Annelids